Mir Hesam (also Romanized as Mīr Ḩesām) is a village in Posht-e Arbaba Rural District, Alut District, Baneh County, Kurdistan Province, Iran. At the 2006 census, its population was 111, in 17 families. The village is populated by Kurds.

References 

Towns and villages in Baneh County